Doddsia is a genus of winter stoneflies in the family Taeniopterygidae. There is one described species in Doddsia, D. occidentalis.

References

Further reading

 
 

Taeniopterygidae
Insects described in 1900